Constituency NA-148 may refer to:

 NA-148 (Sahiwal-II), a present NA constituency based on 2018 delimitation
 NA-148 (Multan-I), a former NA constituency based on 2002 delimitation

National Assembly Constituencies of Pakistan